Pagrus major or red seabream is a fish species in the family Sparidae. It is also known by its Japanese name, madai. The fish has high culinary and cultural importance in Japan, and is also frequently eaten in Korea and Taiwan.

Range and habitat 

Red seabream is a marine subtropical oceanodromous demersal fish, found in the Northwest Pacific from the northeastern part of the South China Sea (Philippines excluded) northward to Japan. Adult fish live near the bottom of reefs at 30–200 meters deep, and are often solitary. Juveniles live in shallower waters.

Physical description 
Red sea breams are relatively large fish, reaching up to 120 cm in length, although they are usually smaller. In countries where it’s eaten, larger specimens are preferred for fishing, but the most commonly consumed fish are between 30 and 70 cm in length. The body is oblong and laterally flattened, with the jaws protruding slightly forward. The pectoral fins are long and slender, reaching nearly half of the total length. The dorsal fin has 12 anterior spines and 10 posterior soft rays, and the anal fin has 3 spines and 8 soft rays. Caudal fins are large and bifid. The mouth has two pairs of sharp fangs on the upper jaw, and three pairs on the lower jaw. There are molars behind the fangs. The scales range from pinkish red to purplish brown, with blue spots across the body. Juveniles have five stripes that disappear upon maturity.

Life cycle 
Red seabream spawns between February and August, when they swim from deeper waters to shallower areas. Eggs and juveniles float freely in the ocean, and are not protected by parents, which makes them easy prey for larger fish. Habitat preference is genetically coded in juveniles, which helps them to choose the optimal microhabitat in a fluctuating environment. Habitat preference is only observed in juvenile fish up to the age of 30 days, while adult fish do not show any habitat preference. Both adults and juveniles feed on small crustaceans, such as shrimp and crabs, as well as smaller fish and sea urchins.

The fish's average life span is between 20 and 40 years.

As food 
In Japan, Pagrus major is known as madai (真鯛 "true sea bream") or simply tai (鯛 "sea bream"). It is prized for its umami flavor and considered a luxury food, often served at festive events such as weddings, and during Japanese New Year. It is also the most commonly eaten fish in Taiwan. In Korea, the fish is called domi (도미) or chamdom (참돔), and is moderately popular as food.

Red seabream can be broiled, grilled, baked or eaten raw, such as in sashimi.

In culture 

Pagrus major is important in Japanese culture, where it is associated with good fortune and abundance, and eaten on special occasions. The red scales are considered auspicious, and traditionally believed to ward off evil spirits. Public figures such as politicians or sumo wrestlers are often photographed holding up a red seabream after a victorious event. Ebisu, the god of fortune and fishermen, is often portrayed holding a red seabream.

Due to its prestige, red seabream is sometimes called "The King of Hundred Fishes" (百魚の王) in Japan, where "hundred" is a metaphor for all other fishes.

Several Japanese idioms also reference the red seabream as a precious object:
 Ebi de tai o tsuru (海老で鯛を釣る "To fish a sea bream using a shrimp as bait"): To gain a great profit or achievement with minimal investment.
 Kusatte mo tai (腐っても鯛  "Even if it's rotten, it's still sea bream"): Something of high quality still retains its value even if it becomes degraded.
 Tai no o yori iwashi no atama (鯛の尾より鰯の頭 "Better a sardine's head than a sea bream's tail"): It's better to be the leader of a small group rather than a follower of a large group.

The tai no tai (鯛の鯛 "bream within bream") is a good luck charm consisting of a fish's scapula and coracoid bones, which resemble a red seabream. The bones are interpreted as a "second bream" inside the original bream, which is discovered and collected after the fish's meat is consumed. Tai no tai are traditionally associated with red seabreams, but can come from the bones of any fish.

Taiyaki, a cake filled with azuki bean paste, is famously made in the shape of a red seabream (tai), which its inventor intended as a way to make street food feel luxurious.

In art 
The red seabream has historically been the subject of paintings, and its shape has also been used in crafts.

See also
 Red porgy
 Taiyaki, a pancake shaped like and named after red seabream

References
 Takahashi, K and Masuda, R. “ Nurture is above nature: nursery experience determines habitat preference of red sea bream Pagrus major juveniles”  Journal of Ethology 37.3 (2019): 317–323. Web. Sep-2019.

External links
 

Pagrus
Taxa named by Coenraad Jacob Temminck
Taxa named by Hermann Schlegel
Fish described in 1843
Fish of the Pacific Ocean
Fish of Japan
Fish of Russia
Fish of China
Fish of East Asia
Fish of Korea